Edmund Morris (c. 1686 – July 1759), of Loddington, Leicestershire, was an English landowner and Tory politician who sat in the House of Commons from 1722 to 1727.

Morris was the eldest son of Charles Morris of Loddington, Leicestershire and his wife Susanna Bacon, daughter of Sir Edmund Bacon, 4th Baronet MP, of Redgrave, Suffolk. He was educated at Rugby School and matriculated at  Magdalen College, Oxford on 14 December 1702, aged 16. In 1703 he was admitted at Middle Temple. In 1710, he succeeded his father to Loddington. He  married Anne Campbell, the daughter of Sir Alexander Campbell, MP of Calder, Nairn, Scotland on 2 August 1720.

At the 1722 British general election, Morris was returned unopposed as Tory Member of Parliament for Leicestershire. He did not stand in  1727. He was appointed High Sheriff of Leicestershire for the year 1746 to 1747.

Morris was buried at Loddington on 30 July 1759, leaving one son and four daughters.

References 

1686 births
1759 deaths
People from Loddington, Leicestershire
People educated at Rugby School
Alumni of Magdalen College, Oxford
Members of the Middle Temple
Members of the Parliament of Great Britain for Leicestershire
British MPs 1722–1727
High Sheriffs of Leicestershire